Fun Spot Amusement Park & Zoo was an amusement park located in Angola, Indiana. Although it was small in comparison to parks in neighboring states, such as Cedar Point and Michigan's Adventure, it remained one of the largest parks in the region. It also once boasted the only operating roller coaster (Afterburner) with an inversion in the state of Indiana, until Steel Hawg at Indiana Beach opened in 2008. The park closed in 2008.

List of Attractions

References

Further reading
Norris, Joann. (1998). Children's Museums: An American Guidebook. Jefferson, NC: McFarland & Co Inc. 

1956 establishments in Indiana
2008 disestablishments in Indiana
Defunct amusement parks in the United States
Amusement parks in Indiana
Buildings and structures in Steuben County, Indiana
Amusement parks opened in 1956
Amusement parks closed in 2008
Modern ruins